Bratberg is a surname. Notable people with the surname include: 

Ragnhild Bratberg (born 1961), Norwegian orienteering competitor and cross country skier
Sivert Bratberg (1780–1816), Norwegian farmer and teacher
Terje Bratberg (born 1955), Norwegian historian and encyclopedist